Phillips Shivley is a Professor of Political Science at the University of Minnesota. He is the author is a research methods text The Craft of Political Research first published in 1974 and American Democracy in Context.

References

University of Minnesota faculty